The 1970–71 Honduran Liga Nacional season was the 6th edition of the Honduran Liga Nacional.  The format of the tournament remained the same as the previous season.  C.D. Motagua won the title and qualified to the 1971 CONCACAF Champions' Cup along with runners-up Club Deportivo Olimpia.

1970–71 teams

 Atlético Español (Tegucigalpa, promoted)
 Atlético Indio (Tegucigalpa)
 España (San Pedro Sula)
 Lempira (La Lima)
 Marathón (San Pedro Sula)
 Motagua (Tegucigalpa)
 Olimpia (Tegucigalpa)
 Platense (Puerto Cortés)
 Victoria (La Ceiba)
 Vida (La Ceiba)

Regular season

Standings

Championship playoff

 Motagua champions as better regular season record.

Top scorer
  Carlos Alvarado (Vida) with 16 goals

Squads

Known results

Round 1

Round 4

Round 27

Unknown rounds

References

Liga Nacional de Fútbol Profesional de Honduras seasons
1
Honduras